Lim Dall-young (born June 14, 1977) is a South Korean author known for scripting the manhwa Unbalance Unbalance and the Korean–Japanese manhwa Black God and Freezing. He is the founder of Artlim Media, which was established in 1999.

Works

Manhwa 
 Zero: The Gate of Beginning (with Park Sung-woo) (2001–2004)
 Unbalance ×2 (with Soo-Hyun Lee) (2005–2011)
 Zero: Circle of Flow (Version 1) (with Sang-Young Roh) (2005–on hiatus)
 Zero: Circle of Flow (Version 2) (with Sang-Young Roh) (2006–on hiatus)
 Aflame Inferno (with Kwang-Hyun Kim) (2006–on hiatus)
 The Legend of Maian (with Soo-Cheol Jeong) (2007–on hiatus)
 The Phantom King (with Jae-Ho Yoon) (2009–2013)
 Unbalance ×3 (with Soo-Hyun Lee) (2015–on hiatus)
 Unbalance x2: After Story (with Soo-Hyun Lee)

Manga 
 Black God (with Park Sung-woo) (2004–2012)
 Onihime VS (with Soo-Hyun Lee) (2007–2012)
 Freezing (with Kwang-Hyun Kim) (2007–on hiatus)
 Re:Birth – The Lunatic Taker (with Soo-Hyun Lee) (2009–2011)
 Koimoku (with Hae-Won Lee) (2011–2012)
 Ace Maid (with Hae-Won Lee) (2013–2014)
 Freezing: First Chronicle (with Jae-Ho Yoon) (2011–2012)
 Sai:Taker – Futari no Artemis (with Soo-Hyun Lee) (2012–2013)
 Freezing: Zero (with Soo-Cheol Jeong) (2012–present)
 Freezing: Pair Love Stories (with So-Hee Kim) (2013–2014)
 Ark Romancer (with So-Hee Kim) (2014–present)
 Monochrome - Teito Ninpouchou (2015-present)
JK kara Yarinaosu Silver Plan (with hye-seong Lee) (2020-present)

Light novels 
 Zero: The Root (2000–2002)
 Zero: Perfect Dimension (with Kwang-Hyun Kim) (2007–2009)
 The Phantom King (with Soo-Hyun Lee) (2007–on hiatus)

Novels 
 Legios (1995)
 Antithese (1998)
 The Legend of Maian (2000)
 March (2001)
 Third-Year Highschool Love (2001)

Video games 
 Zero: Circle of Flow (2000)
 Scarred Gem (2001)
 Aoi Namida (Blue Tears) (2003)

Dōjinshi (under pen name Moonzero) 
 Cross Make (with CDPA) (2008–present)

Artbooks 
 Lim Extra Works (2011)

References

External links
Official blog 
Artlim Media official website 

1977 births
Living people
South Korean manhwa writers
Manga writers